The United States one-hundred-dollar bill ($100) is a denomination of United States currency. The first United States Note with this value was issued in 1862 and the Federal Reserve Note version was launched in 1914, alongside other denominations. Statesman, inventor, diplomat, and American Founding Father Benjamin Franklin has been featured on the obverse of the bill since 1914. On the reverse of the banknote is an image of Independence Hall in Philadelphia, which has been used since 1928.

The bills are also commonly referred to as "Bens", "Benjamins", or "Franklins", in reference to the use of Benjamin Franklin's portrait by the French painter Joseph Duplessis on the denomination, as "C-Notes" or "Century Notes", based on the Roman numeral for 100, or as "blue faces", based on the blue tint of Benjamin Franklin's face in the bill's current design. The bill is one of two denominations printed today that does not feature a president of the United States, the other being the $10 bill, featuring Alexander Hamilton. It is also the only denomination today to feature a building not located in Washington, D.C., that being Independence Hall located in Philadelphia on the reverse. The time on the clock of Independence Hall on the reverse, according to the U.S. Bureau of Engraving and Printing, showed approximately 4:10. It has been suggested this may refer to 4/10, or April 10, the 100th day of the year. The newer colorized notes show 10:30.

The Series 2009  bill redesign was unveiled on April 21, 2010, and was issued to the public on October 8, 2013. The new bill costs 12.6 cents to produce and has a blue ribbon woven into the center of the currency with "100" and Liberty Bells, alternating, that appear when the bill is tilted.

As of June 30, 2012, the  bill comprised 77% of all US currency in circulation. Federal Reserve data from 2017 showed that the number of  bills exceeded the number of  bills. However, a 2018 research paper by the Federal Reserve Bank of Chicago estimated that 80 percent of  bills were in other countries. Possible reasons included $100 bills being used as a reserve currency against economic instability that affected other currencies, and use of the bills for criminal activities.

History

Large size notes
( 7.4218 × 3.125 in ≈ 189 × 79 mm)

 1861: Three-year 100-dollar Interest Bearing Notes were issued that paid 7.3% interest per year. These notes were not primarily designed to circulate and were payable to the original purchaser of the dollar bill. The obverse of the note featured a portrait of General Winfield Scott.
 1862: The first  United States Note was issued. Variations of this note were issued that resulted in slightly different wording (obligations) on the reverse; the note was issued again in Series of 1863.
 1863: Both one and two and one half year Interest Bearing Notes were issued that paid 5% interest. The one-year Interest Bearing Notes featured a vignette of George Washington in the center, and allegorical figures representing "The Guardian" to the right and "Justice" to the left. The two-year notes featured a vignette of the U.S. treasury building in the center, a farmer and mechanic to the left, and sailors firing a cannon to the right.
 1863: The first  Gold Certificates were issued with a bald eagle to the left and large green 100 in the middle of the obverse. The reverse was distinctly printed in orange instead of green like all other U.S. federal government issued notes of the time.
 1864: Compound Interest Treasury Notes were issued that were intended to circulate for three years and paid 6% interest compounded semi-annually. The obverse is similar to the 1863 one-year Interest Bearing Note.
 1869: A new  United States Note was issued with a portrait of Abraham Lincoln on the left of the obverse and an allegorical figure representing architecture on the right.
 1870: A new  Gold Certificate with a portrait of Thomas Hart Benton on the left side of the obverse was issued. The note was one-sided.
 1870: One hundred dollar National Gold Bank Notes were issued specifically for payment in gold coin by participating national gold banks. The obverse featured vignettes of Perry leaving the USS St. Lawrence and an allegorical figure to the right; the reverse featured a vignette of U.S. gold coins.
 1875: The reverse of the Series of 1869 United States Note was redesigned. This note was issued again in Series of 1878 and Series of 1880.
 1878: The first  silver certificate was issued with a portrait of James Monroe on the left side of the obverse. The reverse was printed in black ink, unlike any other U.S. Federal Government issued bill.
 1882: A new and revised  Gold Certificate was issued. The obverse was partially the same as the Series 1870 gold certificate; the border design, portrait of Thomas H. Benton, and large word , and gold-colored ink behind the serial numbers were all retained. The reverse featured a perched bald eagle and the Roman numeral for 100, C.
 1890: One hundred dollar Treasury or "Coin Notes" were issued for government purchases of silver bullion from the silver mining industry. The note featured a portrait of Admiral David G. Farragut. The note was also nicknamed a "watermelon note" because of the watermelon-shaped 0's in the large numeral 100 on the reverse; the large numeral 100 was surrounded by an ornate design that occupied almost the entire note.
 1891: The reverse of the Series of 1890 Treasury Note was redesigned because the Treasury felt that it was too "busy" which would make it too easy to counterfeit. More open space was incorporated into the new design.
 1891: The obverse of the  Silver Certificate was slightly revised with some aspects of the design changed. The reverse was completely redesigned and also began to be printed in green ink.
 1902: An extremely rare National Banknote was issued. It had a blue seal, and John J. Knox on the obverse, and two men and an eagle on top of a shield on the reverse.
 1914: The first  Federal Reserve Note was issued with a portrait of Benjamin Franklin on the obverse and allegorical figures representing labor, plenty, America, peace, and commerce on the reverse.
 1922: The Series of 1880 Gold Certificate was re-issued with an obligation to the right of the bottom-left serial number on the obverse.

Small size notes
(6.14 × 2.61 in ≅ 157 × 66 mm)

 1929: Under the Series of 1928, all U.S. currency was changed to its current size and began to carry a standardized design. All variations of the  bill would carry the same portrait of Benjamin Franklin, same border design on the obverse, and the same reverse with a vignette of Independence Hall. The  bill was issued as a Federal Reserve Note with a green seal and serial numbers and as a Gold Certificate with a golden seal and serial numbers.
 1933: As an emergency response to the Great Depression, additional money was pumped into the American economy through Federal Reserve Bank Notes issued under Series of 1929. This was the only small-sized  bill that had a slightly different border design on the obverse. The serial numbers and seal on it were brown.
 1934: The redeemable in gold clause was removed from Federal Reserve Notes due to the U.S. withdrawing from the gold standard.
 1934: Special  Gold Certificates were issued for non-public, Federal Reserve bank-to-bank transactions. These notes featured a reverse printed in orange instead of green like all other small-sized notes.
 1950: Many minor aspects on the obverse of the  Federal Reserve Note were changed. Most noticeably, the treasury seal, gray numeral '100', and the Federal Reserve Seal were now smaller with small "spikes" added around the Federal Reserve seal, like the Treasury seal.
 1963: Because dollar bills were no longer redeemable in silver, beginning with Series 1963A,  was removed from the obverse of the  Federal Reserve Note and the obligation was shortened to its current wording, . Also,  was added to the reverse.
 1966: The first and only small-sized  United States Note was issued with a red seal and serial numbers. It was the first of all United States currency to use the new U.S. treasury seal with wording in English instead of Latin. Like the Series 1963  and  United States Notes, it lacked  on the obverse and featured the motto  on the reverse. The  United States Note was issued due to legislation that specified a certain dollar amount of United States Notes that were to remain in circulation. United States Notes were last printed in 1969 and last issued in 1971.
 1990: The first new-age anti-counterfeiting measures were introduced under Series 1990 with microscopic printing around Franklin's portrait and a metallic security strip on the left side of the bill.
 March 25, 1996: The first major design change of the  note since 1929 took place with the adoption of a contemporary style layout. The main intent of the new design was to deter counterfeiting, which had become more rampant following the rise of computer printing and Image scanning technology. New security features included a watermark of Franklin to the right side of the bill, optically variable ink (OVI) that changed from green to black when viewed at different angles on the lower right corner '100', an enlarged  and different portrait of Franklin, and hard-to-reproduce fine line printing around Franklin's portrait and Independence Hall. Older security features such as interwoven red and blue silk fibers, microprinting, and a plastic security thread (which now glows pink [nominally red] under a black light) were kept. The individual Federal Reserve Bank Seal with district letter was changed to a unified Federal Reserve System Seal along with an additional prefix letter being added to the serial number, w. The first of the Series 1996 bills were produced in October, 1995.
 February 2007: The first  bills (a shipment of 128,000 star notes from the San Francisco FRB) from the Western Currency Facility in Fort Worth, Texas are produced, almost 16 years after the first notes from the facility were produced. The shipment makes the  bill the most recently added production to the facility's lineup. 4.6 billion notes were produced at the facility with series 2006 and Cabral and Paulson signatures, including about 4.15 million star notes.
 October 8, 2013: The newest  bill was announced on April 21, 2010, and, because of printing problems, did not enter circulation until nearly three and a half years later, on October 8, 2013. In addition to design changes introduced in 1996, the obverse features the brown quill that was used to sign the Declaration of Independence; faint phrases from the Declaration of Independence; the Syng inkstand's inkwell; a bell within the inkwell's image that appears and disappears depending on the angle at which the bill is viewed using optically variable ink (OVI) and changes from copper to green; teal background color; a borderless portrait of Benjamin Franklin; a blue "3D security ribbon" (trademarked "Motion" by Crane Currency) on which images of Liberty Bells shift into numerical designations of '100' as the note is tilted; and to the left of Franklin, small yellow 100s whose zeros form the EURion constellation. The reverse features a large gradient '100' printed vertically on the right side, small yellow EURion 100s and has the fine lines removed from around the vignette of Independence Hall. These notes were issued as Series 2009A with Rios-Geithner signatures. Many of these changes are intended not only to thwart counterfeiting but to also make it easier to quickly check authenticity and help vision-impaired people.

Series dates

Small size

Withdrawal of large denomination bills ($500 and up)

On July 14, 1969, the Federal Reserve announced that the large denominations of United States currency would be withdrawn from circulation; banks were instructed to return any notes received or deposited larger than $100 to the United States Treasury. While the larger denominations remained legal tender, with their removal, the $100 note was the largest denomination remaining in circulation. All the Federal Reserve Notes produced from Series 1928 up to before Series 1969 (i.e. 1928, 1928A, 1934, 1934A, 1934B, 1934C, 1934D, 1950, 1950A, 1950B, 1950C, 1950D, 1950E, 1963, 1966, 1966A) of the  denomination added up to  billion. Since some banknotes had been destroyed, and the population was 200 million at the time, there was less than one  banknote per capita circulating.

Since 1969, the demand for U.S. currency has greatly increased. The total amount of circulating currency and coin passed one trillion dollars in March 2011.

Despite the degradation in the value of the U.S.  banknote (which was worth about $ in 1969), and despite competition from some more valuable foreign notes (most notably, the 500 euro banknote), there are no current plans to re-issue banknotes above . Today's widespread use of electronic means to conduct high-value transactions has made large-scale physical cash transactions for legitimate business unnecessary, from the government's point of view. Quoting T. Allison, Assistant to the Board of the Federal Reserve System in his October 8, 1998 testimony before the U.S. House of Representatives, Subcommittee on Domestic and International Monetary Policy, Committee on Banking and Financial Services:

References

Further reading

External links

 Note

Currencies introduced in 1861
Works about Benjamin Franklin
One-hundred-base-unit banknotes
100